New Interfaces for Musical Expression, also known as NIME, is an international conference dedicated to scientific research on the development of new technologies and their role in musical expression and artistic performance.

History
The conference began as a workshop (NIME 01) at the ACM Conference on Human Factors in Computing Systems (CHI) in 2001 in Seattle, Washington, with the concert and demonstration sessions being held at the Experience Music Project museum. Since then, international conferences have been held annually around the world:

Areas of application
The following is a partial list of topics covered by the NIME conference:
 Design reports on novel controllers and interfaces for musical expression
 Performance experience reports on live performance and composition using novel controllers
 Controllers for virtuosic performers, novices, education and entertainment
 Perceptual & cognitive issues in the design of musical controllers
 Movement, visual and physical expression with sonic expressivity
 Musical mapping algorithms and intelligent controllers
 Novel controllers for collaborative performance
 Interface protocols for musical control (e.g. Open Sound Control)
 Artistic, cultural, and social impact of new performance interfaces
 Real-time gestural control in musical performance
 Mapping strategies and their influence on digital musical instrument design
 Sensor and actuator technologies for musical applications
 Haptic and force feedback devices for musical control
 Real-time computing tools and interactive systems
 Pedagogical applications of new interfaces - Courses and curricula

Other related conferences
Other similarly themed conferences include
 International Computer Music Conference (ICMC);
 ACM Multimedia
 Sound and music computing (SMC)

See also
 Live coding
 List of electronic music festivals
 Experimental musical instrument – about several alternative instruments.

References

Further reading

Allen, Jamie. “Review of NIME 2005.” Computer Music Journal 30/1 (Spring 2006).
Taylor, Gregory. "On the Road: NIME 2017" 
Lehrman, Paul D. “Tomorrow's Virtuosi & What They’ll Be Playing: A report from the fifth New Interfaces for Musical Expression conference, in Vancouver, British Columbia, Canada, May 2005 .” Sound on Sound.
Poupyrev, Ivan, Lyons, Michael J., Fels, Sidney, Blaine, Tina (Bean). "New Interfaces for Musical Expression." ACM CHI'01, Extended Abstracts, pp. 491–492, 2001.
Pritchard, Bob. “[Report] NIME 2010.” eContact! 12.4 — Perspectives on the Electroacoustic Work / Perspectives sur l’œuvre électroacoustique (August 2010). Montréal: CEC.
Richardson, Patrick. “Innovative New Digital Instruments: NIME Conference Multimedia Mega-Report.” Extensive report on NIME07. Create Digital Music blog. Posted 25 June 2007.

External links

Official website
Index to NIME Conference Proceedings. From Trier University’s DBLP database.

Computer music
Computer science conferences
Experimental music
Experimental musical instruments
Human–computer interaction
Multimodal interaction
Music conferences
Music technology
Musical techniques
Musical instruments
Electronic music festivals in the United States
Electronic music festivals in Canada
Electronic music festivals in the United Kingdom
Electronic music festivals in Europe
Electronic music festivals in Australia
Electronic music festivals in Japan
Electroacoustic music festivals
Music festivals established in 2001